Haram is an Arabic term 'forbidden'.

Haram or Al-Haram may also refer to:

Haram (site), 'sanctuary' or 'holy shrine' in the Islamic faith or Arabic language
Great Mosque of Mecca (Masjid al-Haram), Saudi Arabia
Temple Mount (Haram al-Sharif), Jerusalem

Music 

 Haram (Armand Hammer album), 2021
 Haram, album by Gunplay, 2017
 Haram!, album by GoldLink, 2021

Films
Haram (film), a 2015 Indian film
The Sin (1965 film), or Al-Haram, an Egyptian film

People
Al-Haram (tribe), the Bedouin tribe
Ali Haram (born 1988), a Bahraini footballer
Woo Ha-ram (born 1988), a South Korean diver

Places
Haram, Iran
Haram, Norway
Haram (Yemen)
Al-Haram, Jaffa, Palestine

See also

Harem (disambiguation)
Herem (disambiguation)
H-R-M
Boko Haram, a jihadist terrorist organization